Carlyle Moore, Jr. (January 5, 1909 – March 3, 1977) was an American actor. 

Carlyle Moore Jr. was born in New York City in 1909. His father, Carlyle Moore, Sr., was a playwright whose work included the play that provided the basis for the 1915 film Stop Thief! Moore became a licensed private pilot at age 17.

He was the office boy in the 1927 show Ink. He received positive notice for his role in Road Gang.

In addition to acting, he also wrote plays.

In 1937, Moore married actress Jane Fenmore Barnes. He died in 1977.

Partial filmography
What a Man (1930 film)
Tomorrow's Children (1934)
Murder in the Fleet (1935) 
Give Me Liberty (1936 film)  
Bengal Tiger (1936 film)
Melody for Two  (1937)
Arizona Legion (1939)
Secret Service of the Air (1939) as Radio operator
Flight Angels (1940) as Radio operator
Murder in the Air (1940) as Sunnyvale radio operator
Brother Rat and a Baby (1940) as Lieutenant
A Child is Born (1940) as Intern
Knute Rockne - All American (1940), as player

References

External links 

 

1909 births
1977 deaths
American male actors